Knodus borki is a species of characin endemic to Peru, where it is found in the vicinity of Iquitos.  It is found in a freshwater environment within a benthopelagic depth range. This species is native to a tropical environment. It lives in the habitats of rivers, streams, and tributaries.

K. borki reaches about 2 in (5 cm) in length. It is one of several species known by the common name blue tetra.

Named in honor of German aquarist Dieter Bork, “who has contributed much to the development of aquariology as a dedicated aquarium friend (breeder, author and photographer)”; he also supplied the type specimen.

References

 
 Blue tetra is not Boehlkea fredcochui, says scientist 

Characidae
Endemic fauna of Peru
Freshwater fish of Peru
Fish of the Amazon basin
Taxa named by Axel Zarske
Fish described in 2008